East Davis Street Historic District is a national historic district located at Burlington, Alamance County, North Carolina. It encompasses 43 contributing buildings in a primarily residential section of Burlington.  It includes single and multi-family dwellings, one commercial building and one church that were predominantly
constructed from the 1880s to 1950. The buildings include representative examples of Queen Anne and Classical Revival style architecture.

It was added to the National Register of Historic Places in 2000.

References

Historic districts on the National Register of Historic Places in North Carolina
Houses on the National Register of Historic Places in North Carolina
Queen Anne architecture in North Carolina
Neoclassical architecture in North Carolina
Buildings and structures in Burlington, North Carolina
National Register of Historic Places in Alamance County, North Carolina
Houses in Alamance County, North Carolina